The Miss Perú 1961 pageant was held on June 8, 1961. Fifteen candidates competed for the two national crowns. The winner represented Peru at the Miss Universe 1961 and Miss International 1961.The rest of the finalists would enter in different pageants.

Placements

Special Awards

 Best Regional Costume - Lambayeque - Heddy González 
 Miss Photogenic - Ayacucho - Carmela Stein 
 Miss Congeniality - Cuzco - Eva Ocampo
 Miss Elegance - Loreto - Norma González Miranda

.

Delegates

Amazonas - Alicia De La Riva Rossi
Apurímac - Teresa Rivero
Arequipa - Luisa Arata
Ayacucho - Carmela Stein
Callao - Rosario Orbegoso
Cuzco - Eva Ocampo
Distrito Capital - Heddie Hawie
Europe Perú - Ellide Dupeyrat

Huánuco - Luisa María Cuculiza
Lambayeque - Heddy González Pérrigo
Loreto - Norma González Miranda
Madre de Dios - Vilma Mantilla
Pasco - María Isabel Lucena
San Martín - Luz Reyes
Tacna - Nelly Amiel

References 

Miss Peru
1961 in Peru
1961 beauty pageants